Marietta Farrell (born 26 October 1951) is an Irish Social Democratic and Labour Party (SDLP) politician who was a Member of the Northern Ireland Assembly (MLA) for Lagan Valley between January and March 2007.

Born in County Sligo, Farrell studied in London and Northern Ireland before becoming a teacher and joining the SDLP.  A former member of BBC Northern Ireland Education Committee and the Northern Ireland Youth Council, she stood unsuccessfully for the Westminster seat of North Down at the 1997 and 2001 general elections.

When SDLP MLA Patricia Lewsley resigned from the Northern Ireland Assembly, Farrell replaced her, her appointment being ratified on 9 January 2007.  She stood for Lewsley's former Lagan Valley seat at the 2007 election, but was unsuccessful, with Sinn Féin's Paul Butler winning the seat.

References
Northern Ireland Assembly biography

1951 births
Living people
Female members of the Northern Ireland Assembly
Northern Ireland MLAs 2003–2007
Politicians from County Sligo
Social Democratic and Labour Party MLAs